Binbrook is a village and civil parish in the East Lindsey district of Lincolnshire, England.

Previously a larger market town, it now has a population of about 700, rising to 892 at the Census 2011.

Binbrook Grade II listed Anglican parish church is dedicated to St Mary and St Gabriel. There were two village churches, St Mary and St Gabriel, since disappeared. A new church with joint dedication was built in 1869 by James Fowler.

Binbrook was the birthplace of the traditional singer Joseph Taylor, one of the Lincolnshire singers recorded by Percy Grainger.

Binbrook is close to the site of Binbrook Airfield, originally opened as RAF Binbrook; the airfield housing is now the new village of Brookenby.

Governance
An electoral ward in the same name exists. This ward stretches south east to Fotherby with a total population taken at the 2011 census of 1,831.

Orford
To the north is the site of the lost medieval village of Orford. Orford was the site of a priory of Premonstratensian nuns. The priory was founded around 1170 by Ralf d'Albini of the Anglo-Norman baronial house of Mowbray, and was endowed with the church at Wragby. At the time of suppression in 1539 it held a prioress and 7 nuns.

References

External links 

 "Binbrook", Genuki.org.uk; retrieved 29 June 2011
 Village web site
 Binbrook CoE Primary School
 St Mary & St Gabriel Church

Villages in Lincolnshire
Civil parishes in Lincolnshire
East Lindsey District